Peter Doohan and Laurie Warder were the defending champions but did not compete that year.

Paul Chamberlin and Tim Wilkison won in the final 7–6, 6–4 against Mike De Palmer and Gary Donnelly.

Seeds

  Andrew Castle /  Robert Van't Hof (quarterfinals)
  Christian Saceanu /  Milan Šrejber (semifinals)
  Neil Broad /  Eddie Edwards (first round)
  Ricardo Acioly /  Dacio Campos (first round)

Draw

External links
 1989 Bristol Open Doubles draw

Dubles